Chispita (English title: Little Spark) is a Mexican telenovela produced by Valentín Pimstein for Televisa in 1982. It's an original story by Abel Santa Cruz, the telenovela is a remake of the 1979 Argentinean telenovela Andrea Celeste.

Lucero starred as child protagonist, Angélica Aragón and Enrique Lizalde starred as adult protagonists, Usi Velasco starred as co-protagonist, Alma Delfina and Leonardo Daniel starred as young co-protagonists, while Renata Flores starred as main antagonist.

Plot
María Luisa and her husband had a terrible car accident, her husband dies and she lost her memory completely and she is not able to remember anything at all. Because of this incident, María Luisa forgot that she had a daughter, Isabel, who became an orphan and was therefore taken to the orphanage of Father Eugenio, where Isabel begins to live on and grow. When Isabel is 10 years old, she was adopted by Don Alejandro, a respectable man, widower and with 2 children, Juan Carlos y Lilí.

When Isabel is taken home, she meets Gloria, the maid, who becomes her friend, and so does Juan Carlos, but not Lilí or Miss Irene, Lili's tutor. Together, Miss Irene and Lily try to  make life impossible for Isabel. Then, a woman named Bertha appears,  who turns out to be María Luisa's sister, and she contacts Isabel and encourages her to look for her mother due to her strange disappearance. Meanwhile, María Luisa decides to name herself Lucía, due to her lack of memory, and she gets a job in the orphanage directed by Father Eugenio. When Isabel meets Lucía, they befriend each other, without knowing the familiar ties.

Cast

Main 
 Enrique Lizalde as Alejandro de la Mora
 Angélica Aragón as Lucía
 Gastón Tuset as Father Eugenio
 Alma Delfina as Gloria
 Leonardo Daniel as Juan Carlos de la Mora
 Elsa Cárdenas as Hermana Socorro
 Manuel López Ochoa as José
 Aurora Clavel as Flora
 Renata Flores as Irene
 Inés Morales as Pilar
 Samuel Molina as Rogelio
 Josefina Escobedo as Directora
 Roxana Chávez as Olga
 Beatriz Moreno as Lola
 Rogelio Guerra as Esteban
 Usi Velasco as Lili
 Lucero as Isabel / Chispita

Recurring 
 Alberto Mayagoitia as Ángel Guardián
 Hilda Aguirre as Tía Beatriz

Reception and music
Due to its international success, it was decided to make a special album by Timbiriche that included the main theme. However, Lucerito did not sing the theme, but in a special performance by Timbiriche and Lucerito, they sing it together. The soundtrack was recorded in Spanish and Portuguese languages. In Brazil, this telenovela has been broadcast 8 times and Chispita dolls has been sold.

Chispita's opening credits is almost a copy of another opening credits: Pai Herói (Lit. Father Hero) also had its episodes beginning with a jigsaw puzzle being assembled, of which the pictures was a child in a garden, beyond others resemblances. Pai Herói is a Brazilian telenovela produced in 1979 by Rede Globo, and written by Janete Clair. It was a great success in Brazil. Brazilian watchers noted that fact in 1984, when SBT had exhibited Chispita in the country.

The jigsaw intro has the curious point that it was never completed specially in a specific part of the board, but in the progress of the story, new pieces were added and in the last episodes a shaded form appears as a woman walking with Chispita. After the revelation of Chispita's mother identity the shade changed to a full color image of Chispita's mother.

Awards

References

External links
 

1982 telenovelas
Mexican telenovelas
1982 Mexican television series debuts
1983 Mexican television series endings
Television shows set in Mexico
Children's telenovelas
Televisa telenovelas
Mexican television series based on Argentine television series
Spanish-language telenovelas
Television series about orphans